Maximilian Pfaffinger (born 6 May 1988) is a German former footballer who played as a midfielder.

Career
Pfaffinger made his professional debut for SpVgg Unterhaching in the 3. Liga on 20 September 2008, coming on as a substitute in the 90+1st minute for Ricardo Villar in the 2–1 away win against Jahn Regensburg.

References

External links
 Profile at DFB.de
 Profile at kicker.de
 SSV Reutlingen statistics at Fussball.de

1988 births
Living people
People from Rosenheim
Sportspeople from Upper Bavaria
Footballers from Bavaria
German footballers
Association football midfielders
SpVgg Unterhaching II players
SpVgg Unterhaching players
SSV Reutlingen 05 players
3. Liga players
Regionalliga players